HMS Unruffled was a Royal Navy U-class submarine built by Vickers-Armstrong at Barrow-in-Furness. So far she has been the only ship of the Royal Navy to bear the name Unruffled.

Career
Unruffled spent most of her eventful wartime career in the Mediterranean, where she sank the Vichy-French merchant ship Liberia (the former Greek Cape Corso), the Italian auxiliary minesweeper N 10 / Aquila, the Italian merchant ships Leonardo Palomba, Sant'Antioco, Citta di Catania, and Città di Spezia, the Italian tankers Castelverde and Teodolinda, the Italian sailing vessel Amabile Carolina,  the Italian naval auxiliary Z 90 / Redentore, the German merchant ships Lisboa, Pommern and Baalbeck and the French tanker Henri Desprez.

On 13 October 1942 Unruffled torpedoed and sank the Italian cargo ship  in the Tyrrhenian Sea off the north coast of Sicily. Loreto was carrying prisoners of war, 130 of whom were killed.

Although  of bow were blown off Unruffled could not sink the cruiser, having by now run out of torpedoes. Another attack by  failed, but Attilio Regolo was out of action for the rest of the war.

As well as these actions, Unruffled took part in operations Harpoon and Vigorous. She was also the recovery vessel for Operation Principal, a chariot attack on Palermo harbour on 3 January 1943.

Unruffled survived the War and was scrapped at Troon in January 1946.

References

External links
 IWM Interview with John Stevens, who commanded HMS Unruffled from 1942 to 1944

 

1941 ships
Ships built in Barrow-in-Furness
British U-class submarines
World War II submarines of the United Kingdom